The ITFA Best Actress Award is given by the state government as part of its annual International Tamil Film Awards for Tamil (Kollywood) films. The award was first given in 2003.

The list
Here is a list of the award winners and the films for which they won.

See also

 Tamil cinema
 Cinema of India

References

Actress
Film awards for lead actress